Graphium sandawanum, the Apo swallowtail, is a species of butterfly in the family Papilionidae. It is endemic to the Philippines.

Taxonomy
Graphium hicetaon belongs to the wallacei species group. This clade has four members:
Graphium wallacei (Hewitson, 1858)
Graphium hicetaon (Mathew, 1886)
Graphium browni (Godman & Salvin, 1879)
Graphium sandawanum Yamamoto, 1977

References

Sources
Page M. G.P & Treadaway, C. G. 2003 Schmetterlinge der Erde, Butterflies of the World Part XVII (17), Papilionidae IX Papilionidae of the Philippine Islands. Edited by Erich Bauer and Thomas Frankenbach Keltern: Goecke & Evers; Canterbury: Hillside Books.

External links

External images

sandawanum
Lepidoptera of the Philippines
Endemic fauna of the Philippines
Fauna of Mindanao
Taxonomy articles created by Polbot